14 February is a Maldivian romantic horror television series developed for Television Maldives by Ahmed Saeed. The series stars Fathimath Azifa, Ahmed Asim, Ahmed Saeed, Abdulla Naseer, Aminath Shareef and Ahmed Shah in pivotal roles. The series was aired on the occasion of 1431 Ramadan.

Premise
Najuma (Aminath Shareef) and Khalid (Abdulla Naseer) discuss the mysterious murder of their daughter, Suma, who allegedly bled to death six years ago, on 14 February. Suma's twin sister, Shima (Fathimath Azifa) is romantically involved with a spirit in disguise of a human, Ayaan (Ahmed Saeed), a friend of Mahil (Ahmed Asim) who is attracted to Shima. Suspecting an illogical and inconsistent behavior from Ayaan, Mahil interrogates with Shima and explains that she is in love with a ghost. Meanwhile, Ayaan battles with Affal (Ahmed Shah) an evil spirit who murdered Suma.

Cast and characters
 Fathimath Azifa as Shima / Suma
 Ahmed Asim as Mahil
 Ahmed Saeed as Ayaan
 Abdulla Naseer as Khalid
 Aminath Shareef as Najuma
 Ahmed Shah as Affal

Soundtrack

References

Serial drama television series
Maldivian television shows